The pink brotula, Brosmodorsalis persicinus, is a species of viviparous brotula, the only member of the genus Brosmodorsalis.

References
 

Bythitidae
Monotypic fish genera
Endemic marine fish of New Zealand
Fish described in 1989